is the second Japanese single by the South Korean boy band Big Bang released under YG Entertainment. The song has sold more than 30,829 copies so far.

Track listing

Release history

References

External links 
Big Bang Official Website
Big Bang Japan Official Website
Big Bang by Universal Music Japan

BigBang (South Korean band) songs
2009 singles
YG Entertainment singles
Universal Music Japan singles
Japanese-language songs
2009 songs